HMS Curacoa was a fifth-rate 36-gun sailing frigate of the Royal Navy. Ordered in October 1806 and launched in September 1809, she was one of a new series of Apollo-class frigates designed by Sir William Rule in 1798. Curacoa was 952  tons (bm), armed with a main battery of twenty-six  and carried a complement of 264 men when fully manned.

First commissioned by Captain John Tower, who commanded her through her entire service, Curacoa spent two years on duty around the Channel Islands before being posted to the Mediterranean in 1811, first off the east coast of Italy and then in the Balearic Sea. At the end of the Napoleonic Wars, Curacoa was converted to a 24-gun sixth-rate corvette and sent to South America to assist with the suppression of the slave trade. She was broken up in March 1849.

Construction and armament
HMS Curacoa was one of a new batch of Apollo-class frigates constructed for the Royal Navy between 1803 and 1812, from a 1798 design by Sir William Rule.

Built under contract by Robert Guillaume, Curacoa was ordered on 1 October 1806 and her keel was laid down in January 1808 at Northfleet shipyard. This made her 952  tons (bm). She would carry a complement of 264 men when fully manned.

Although classed as a 36-gun fifth rate, Curacoa was armed with a main battery of twenty-six  on her gun deck, two  on the quarter deck and two on the forecastle. She also carried 14  carronades, short lightweight guns with a large bore. They were cheaper to produce and much easier to handle than the equivalent long gun but lacked the accuracy and range. Ten were carried on Curacoa's quarter deck and four on her forecastle.

Service

First commissioned under Captain John Tower in October 1809, Curacoa sailed for the Channel Islands. On 25 September 1810, Curacoa captured a French schooner, Aventurier, then while off Lands End on 9 November, a 14-gun French privateer called Venus. A few days later, on 17 October, Curacoa was sailing with Northumberland when Curacoa took a former British brig, Standley. The French cargo she was carrying was sold and the crews of the British ships shared in the proceeds. On 5 November, Curacoa captured Zodiac, another former British brig, and profitted from her salvaged cargo.

On 17 November 1811, Curacoa was posted to the Mediterranean. The British ships were patrolling the western coast of Italy when, on 27 June, they encountered 18 French vessels anchored off Alassio and Laigueglia. Although the British managed to put the two batteries on the shore out of action, they were unable to bring off the French vessels which were instead abandoned and destroyed by the British guns.

In January 1812, Curacoa was in a squadron under Commodore Edward Codrington, off the coast of the Spanish province of Barcelona.
The three ships opened up a barrage, driving the enemy troops far inshore.
Three days later on 29 January, while anchored off Arenys de Mar, word was received of a 7,000-strong French army marching from Barcelona to Mataro. The next day the three vessels spotted the French force near Vilassar de Mar and opened fire on it.

On hearing that another division of French troops was on its way to Arenys from the north-east, Codrington sent Curacoa and Papillon with food and 11,500 rounds of ammunition for the Spanish irregular forces in the mountains behind the town. These supplies enabled the guerrillas to maintain their position and harass the enemy. Late on 1 February, the French force reached Canet de Mar where it was seen and attacked by boats from Curacoa and Papillon; lack of wind preventing the ships from getting close enough. The action was insufficient however to stop the French marching on to Arenys.

After pillaging the town, the French forces in Mataro withdrew on the morning of 2 February with the intention of joining their compatriots at Arenys. They managed to avoid the attention of the British ships by escaping through some vineyards while it was still dark but this route brought them into conflict with Spanish guerrillas. With the assistance of Curacoa, Papillon and Blake which began a bombardment, the Spanish were able to delay the French but not prevent them from reaching their objective.

Curacoa and the 36-gun frigate, used boats to land marines and seamen near the harbour of Campo del Porto, Elba, on 20 June 1813. When the batteries protecting the town were over-run and the troops there routed, the French scuttled three of their own ships to prevent them from becoming prizes. The following morning, having returned to the boats, the marines captured a small convoy of three settees and drove the brig protecting them into Portoferraio. Two large feluccas were taken from the town of Mesca in the Gulf of Spezia, on 28 June. Prevented by the wind from using the ships, the British once more took to boats but only succeeded in driving their quarry inshore. Later that evening the wind changed direction and Aigle and Curacoa were able to bombard the town while marines took the feluccas from the beach.

In 1814, Curacoa was in Vice-Admiral Sir Edward Pellew's fleet and took part in operations against the province of Genoa. When a joint British and Sicilian army under Lord William Bentinck occupied the city of Genoa on 19 April, Curacoa was one of the ships sent to provide naval support.

Post war
Curacoa paid off in 1815, the second Treaty of Paris, signed on the 20 November,ending the Napoleonic wars. Substantial repairs were made to Curacoa at Deptford, between March 1817 and February 1819. Afterwhich, in 1822, she was laid up at Woolwich. In February 1831, she was converted to a 24-gun sixth-rate corvette and recommissioned in April for service in the East Indies.

After returning home in 1834, Curacoa was refitted at Chatham Dockyard between February and July 1839, before being sent to South America to assist with the suppression of the slave trade. On 31 March 1840, Curacoa captured Thirteenth of June, a Portuguese brigantine. In 1847, Curacoa sailed for England and on 29 March 1848, she was put up for sale at Sheerness and broken up there in March the following year.

Notes

Citations

References

 

 
 
 

 
 

Fifth-rate frigates of the Royal Navy
Sixth-rate frigates of the Royal Navy
Ships built in Northfleet
1809 ships